Paul Peterson (February 26, 1921 – August 27, 2019) was a Canadian football player who played for the Hamilton Flying Wildcats, winning the Grey Cup with them in 1943. He was the last surviving member of the championship team.

References

1921 births
2019 deaths
Hamilton Wildcats football players
Players of Canadian football from Ontario
Sportspeople from Kitchener, Ontario